Michael Ledger (born 15 November 1996) is an English footballer who plays as a centre-back for Spennymoor Town. He has previously played for Sunderland, Notodden, Queen of the South and Greenock Morton, and on loan at Viking and Hartlepool United.

Career

Sunderland
Born in Consett, Ledger joined the Sunderland Academy at the age of seven. After progressing through the youth system at Sunderland, Ledger was captain for the under-18 team and his impressive displays resulted in him signing his first professional contract. Soon after that he was promoted to the development squad in June 2015.

Whilst progressing through the development squad at Sunderland, Ledger started to feature during the 2016-17 season, as he played on four occasions in the EFL Trophy campaign. On 2 January 2017, Ledger was called up to the first-team squad for the first time, although he was an unused substitute in the 2–2 draw versus Liverpool. After his loan spell with Viking ended, Ledger signed a full-time contract with the Black Cats in June 2017.

Loan Spells
In November 2016, Ledger was sent out on loan to Norwegian club Viking until their close season in February 2017  and debuted for the club on 3 April 2017, in a 1–0 defeat away to Vålerenga. He then claimed an assist for Samuel Adegbenro in a 4–2 defeat versus Strømsgodset on 29 May 2017. During his time at the club Ledger started in every match for Viking, with his final appearance coming on 18 June 2017, in a 1–0 defeat against Lillestrøm.

Despite interest from clubs in the Bundesliga, Ledger was loaned out to Hartlepool United on 31 August 2017, until the end of the season, debuting in a 3–1 win versus Maidstone United on 14 September 2017. After suffering an injury set-back in late September 2017, Ledger remained in the first-team, despite competition from other squad players.

Notodden FK
On 13 March 2018, Ledger signed for Notodden FK in Norway on a two-year contract.

Queen of the South
On 31 January 2020, Ledger signed for Dumfries club Queen of the South until 30 June 2020.

Greenock Morton
On 25 September 2020, Ledger signed for Scottish Championship side Greenock Morton.

Spennymoor Town
On 20 August 2022, Ledger moved back to England when he signed for National League North side Spennymoor Town.

Career statistics

Personal life
Ledger is a Sunderland supporter.

References

External links
 
 

1997 births
Living people
Association football defenders
English footballers
English expatriate footballers
Hartlepool United F.C. players
National League (English football) players
Notodden FK players
Queen of the South F.C. players
Greenock Morton F.C. players
Viking FK players
Eliteserien players
Spennymoor Town F.C. players
Norwegian First Division players
Scottish Professional Football League players
Expatriate footballers in Norway
Expatriate footballers in Scotland
English expatriate sportspeople in Norway